No. 134 Squadron RAF was a part of the Royal Air Force which was formed as a light bomber unit in World War I and reformed as a fighter squadron in World War II.

History

First World War
No. 134 Squadron Royal Flying Corps was formed on 1 March 1918 and became a unit of the Royal Air Force a month later but disbanded on 17 August 1918.

Second World War
The squadron reformed from a nucleus provided by 17 Squadron in July 1941 as a fighter unit equipped with Hawker Hurricanes stationed at RAF Leconfield. It was then based near Murmansk to train Russian pilots until the Hurricanes were handed over to the Russian Navy. Back in the UK the squadron was re-assembled at RAF Catterick on 7 December 1941, moved to Northern Ireland for two months and returned to RAF Baginton (in Warwickshire) to prepare to move overseas once again. It then operated in Egypt until November 1943 when it moved to India and Burma. The squadron converted to the P-47 Thunderbolt and disbanded by being renumbered 131 Squadron.

Aircraft operated

Footnotes

References

External links

 History of 131–135 Squadrons at RAF Web
 134 Squadron history on the official RAF website

134
Military units and formations established in 1918
1918 establishments in the United Kingdom
Military units and formations in Mandatory Palestine in World War II